Anabarites is a problematic lower Cambrian genus, and is one of the small shelly fossils. It was abundant in the early Tommotian and is also found in the Nemakit-Daldynian.
The fossils represent the triradially symmetrical  mineralised tube in which the organism dwelt; it was sedentary. It is named after the Anabar region in Yakutia, Russia; its name does not imply 'heavy'.

Further reading
For images, see

References

Enigmatic prehistoric animal genera
Cambrian animals of Asia
Paleozoic life of Newfoundland and Labrador

Cambrian genus extinctions